Vjatšeslav Zahovaiko (born 29 December 1981) is an Estonian football coach and former player who currently manages Gambian side Real de Banjul. Zahovaiko played for several professional clubs and was also a member of the Estonian national team.

Club career

FC Flora Tallinn
In 2006, he was the world's most effective top division goal scorer with 1.2 goals per game.
At the start of 2007, he was loaned out to Al Kuwait Kaifan, but after featuring in just a few friendly games for the Kuwaiti side he was told that his contract was invalid and he was sent back to Estonia. Both his club and his agent sent a complaint to FIFA.  He plays the position of forward and is 1.87 m tall.

U.D. Leiria
On 30 December 2009, he signed a two-and-a-half-year contract with Portuguese team U.D. Leiria. In the first season he played in 6 league games and one cup game, but failed to score in these.

Kuopion Palloseura
In April 2012 Zahovaiko joined Finnish Veikkausliiga club Kuopion Palloseura.

Statistics
Correct as of 27 October 2011.

International career
He has played a total of 39 games for Estonia national football team, scoring 8 goals. His first international goal was against Ecuador in a friendly game. He scored his eighth goal against Uruguay in a 2–0 win game.

International goals

Honours

Individual
 Meistriliiga top goalscorers: 2004
 Estonian Silverball: 2008

References

External links

 Player statistics on Portuguese Liga

1981 births
Living people
People from Kehtna Parish
Estonian footballers
Association football forwards
Estonia international footballers
Estonia under-21 international footballers
Estonia youth international footballers
Meistriliiga players
Primeira Liga players
Veikkausliiga players
Nemzeti Bajnokság I players
JK Tervis Pärnu players
FC Flora players
FC Warrior Valga players
Viljandi JK Tulevik players
FC Elva players
Kuwait SC players
U.D. Leiria players
Debreceni VSC players
Kuopion Palloseura players
Estonian expatriate footballers
Expatriate footballers in Kuwait
Expatriate footballers in Portugal
Expatriate footballers in Hungary
Expatriate footballers in Finland
Estonian expatriate sportspeople in Kuwait
Estonian expatriate sportspeople in Portugal
Estonian expatriate sportspeople in Hungary
Estonian expatriate sportspeople in Finland
Paide Linnameeskond players
Estonian football managers
Estonian expatriate football managers